Valeria Alejandra Vespoli Figuera (born November 25, 1994) is a Venezuelan model, social communicator and beauty pageant titleholder who was titled Miss Supranational Venezuela 2016. Vespoli also represented the Monagas state in Miss Venezuela 2015 where she ended up as one of the semifinalists. Vespoli represented Venezuela in Miss Supranational 2016, obtaining the position of 1st Runner-Up.

Life and career

Early life
Vespoli was born in Maturín, Monagas. She is of Italian descent and has two brothers. She moved to the United States, and it is there that he obtained a BA in Social Communication from Barry University in Miami, Florida. Vespoli has also been playing soccer since the edge of 14.

Pageantry
Valeria began her journey in beauty pageants at the age of 9. Then, when she turned 15, she participated and won the Teen Model Venezuela 2010.

Miss Venezuela 2015 
Vespoli was selected to represent her home state, Monagas, in Miss Venezuela 2015. Vespoli competed with 24 other candidates for the disputed crown. At the end of the event, on October 8, 2015, she obtained the special Miss Authentic award, and managed to classify within the group of 10 semifinalists.

Miss Supranational Venezuela 2016 
Vespoli was designated by the Miss Venezuela Organization in conjunction with Osmel Sousa, as the Venezuelan representative to the international contest, Miss Supranational.

Miss Supranational 2016 
She represented Venezuela in the Miss Supranational 2016 pageant, an event that took place on December 2, 2016 at the Municipal Sports and Recreation Center MOSIR, in Krynica-Zdrój, Poland. Valeria obtained the position of 1st Runner-Up, the highest place achieved by Venezuela in said contest. In addition, she was crowned Continental Queen of the Americas in that edition.

Other projects 
Due to the COVID-19 pandemic, Valeria remains in Venezuela, there she starts a venture as a fashion designer; as well as being the presenter of the Monaguense newspaper, El Siglo. In addition to this, she currently works as a financial advisor.

References

External links
 

1994 births
Living people
Miss Venezuela winners
People from Maturín
Venezuelan female models